The Welland By-pass, completed in 1973, was a massive construction project on the Welland Canal in Ontario, Canada.

The project helped improve navigation along the canal and alleviated problems the presence of a busy ship canal was causing in Welland.

Background
 
Although the city of Welland had originally grown around the canal, by the 1960s the constant interruptions in the flow of the vehicular and rail traffic through the city became bothersome. A single ship would hold up traffic for at least ten minutes as it travelled under a vertical lift bridge. In periods of heavy ship traffic, a bridge might stay raised for multiple ships to pass, and long lines of cars, trucks and buses could be delayed more than 30 minutes. Additionally, many railroad yards and lines originally built on Welland's outskirts now found themselves in the middle of a growing city; the heavily used rail lines from Toronto to Buffalo were suffering delays, as well.
 
The old route, established in 1932 with the building of the fourth Welland Canal, was also inconvenient to the ships since it was twisting and narrow. The five vertical lift bridges and a railroad swing bridge, all within close distance of one another, made the manoeuvring tricky and the journey stressful. Captains complained of bulky buildings on the canal's edge blocking the line of sight. One of them commented, "The main thing every Lakes captain used to dread was Bridge 15 [built during the 3rd canal era, but in use until 1972], a railway bridge in the town of Welland with an abutment in the middle... I think every captain on the Lakes must have [scraped it] at one time or another."

Construction
 
The by-pass project was a massive undertaking: 16.2 km² (4,000 acres) of land was expropriated for the construction. Approximately 50 million cubic metres of material was excavated. Two tunnels, the Main Street Tunnel and the Townline Tunnel, were constructed to allow vehicles and trains to pass beneath the canal.

To complement this, an aqueduct, to convey the Welland River under the new canal alignment, was built. It was constructed from 30,000 cubic metres of concrete. Approximately  of new river channel was constructed to route the river into the aqueduct. The creation of the syphon culvert lowered ground water levels for miles around, the project making many dug wells run dry. The St. Lawrence Seaway Authority denied responsibility, but paid many residents to have a drilled well installed to supply their water. (based on local witnesses)

In compensation for the loss of canal banks through the city of Welland, parts of which were being used as a docking area by local industries, the project incorporated a dock, separated from the main travel route.

Many of the area's rail lines, which had previously been constructed to fit around the existing alignment, had to be dramatically altered for the new alignment. An estimated  of new track was laid at a cost of CAD$50 million. A Google map is available which shows the changes to the rail network as a result of the canal relocation, as well as changes made since. This map also details the old and new routes of the canal.
 
The construction started with the sinking of the first shovel on June 9, 1967, and continued for six years. (During construction, a giant "Earth mover" working on the canal, accidentally struck and ruptured a buried natural gas line, which erupted into a torch-like flame approx 90–100 meters high; there were no injuries.) In a symbolic event watched by many residents, on a snowy night, Bridge #13 on Welland's East Main Street came up for the last time, lighted by floodlights, on December 15, 1972, the new bypass would be open to shipping for the next season. (The bridge was actually quietly opened the next day to allow the passage of a St. Lawrence Seaway service vessel.)
 
The Main Street Tunnel was officially opened on May 20, 1972, with the Townline Tunnel following on July 13. Rail traffic through the Townline Tunnel was inaugurated on January 31, 1973. The new canal was first traversed by the Canadian Coast Guard cutter Griffon on March 27, 1973.  The first commercial ship to pass through the by-pass was the M.V. Senneville on March 28, 1973. It carried a cargo of 1,063,868 bushels of barley in transit from Duluth, Minnesota to Port Cartier, Quebec.  The official opening ceremony for the Welland By-pass took place on July 14, 1973.
 
Overall, the project cost approximately CAD$188 million. It reduced the transit time through the Welland Canal by about 30 minutes (5%) as compared to the old alignment.

Outcomes
 
The Welland By-pass markedly simplified ship passage along the Welland Canal. The city was no longer dependent on often erratic ship schedules. (For instance, a scheduled city-wide bus service was only instituted after the relocation.)
 
A decision had to be made as to the use of the old alignment. Originally, one of the proposed ideas was for it to be filled in and an extension to Highway 406 be run in it. That never came to be, and instead the old canal was turned over to the city and renamed the Welland Recreational Waterway.

Recently, the city has seen the construction of a new Civic Centre, including the city hall and the public library downtown by the old canal.

Since the opening of the by-pass, Welland's east side has become a virtual island; separated from the rest of the Niagara Peninsula by the old canal channel to the west and by the by-pass channel to the east.

External links
The Welland Public Library's Canal history pages contain many newspaper clippings and photos documenting the Canal's history in general, and the construction of the By-pass in particular.
Railway Maps, including maps outlining the By-pass project.

References

 Citation of sources for Google map linked in the Construction section (produced for the benefit of this article);
    
 
 
 Exact placement of tracks determined from Google maps satellite images

Welland Canal